Reinoud III van Brederode (4 September 1492, Brederode Castle, Santpoort – 25 September 1556, in Brussels), lord of Brederode and Vianen, burgrave of Utrecht, master of the woods and master of the hunt of Holland, member of the Council of State.

Reinoud III was the father of Hendrik van Brederode. He was also member of the privy council and chamberlain to Charles V, Holy Roman Emperor. From 1531 on he resided in Castle Batenstein

He was the son of Walraven II van Brederode and Margaretha van Borselen.

As a knight of the Order of the Golden Fleece, he ruled the free lordship of Vianen and Ameide as if these were independent from the county of Holland. He had control over the judiciary and the coinage, which were prerogatives of the count of Holland, and which brought him into conflict with the count, who was worried that Reinoud might make claims to the county. For this he was sentenced to death, but the sentence was later reversed by Charles V.

In 1556 Reinoud died, and was interred in the family grave in the present day reformed church in Vianen. His wife Philippote van der Marck was also buried there in 1537.

Offspring
Reinoud married in 1521 Philippote von der Marck, daughter Robert II van der Marck. They had the following children:
 Helena (1527/28 – Antwerp  1572); married (Antwerp  1549) Thomas Perrenot de Granvelle (Besançon  1521 – Antwerp  1571), son of Nicolas Perrenot de Granvelle
 Hendrik (1531 – 1568), Lord of Brederode, Vianen and Ameide
 Antonia Penelope (died after 1591); married I  (1547) count Hendrik von Isenburg (died Walem (1554); married II Cornelis van Gistel (Corneille de Ghistelles)
 Franciska
 Johanna (died 1573) married (1551) Joost van Bronckhorst (died after 1598)
 Lodewijk (died Saint-Quentin  1557)
 Margaretha (died Namur (1554); married (1542) count Peter Ernst van Mansfeld-Friedeburg (1517 – 1604)
 Filips (died Milan 1554)
 Reinoud 
 Robert (died in Bavaria 1566)

In addition he had several illegitimate children:

 Anna; married Gijsbert van Schoten
 Artus (died  1592); married (Haarlem 1560) Anna van der Laan
 Frans (died before 1589); married Hendrika de Wilde (1521 – 1613)
 Lancelot (died 1573)
 Lucretia (died after 1544); married (1539) Jan van Haeften (died after 1584), Lord of Gameren
 Margaretha (died  1574); married Roelof Grauwert (died Vianen 1572), Lord Weerdestein
 Sandrina (Vianen 1539 – Wijk bij Duurstede  1617); married I Albert van Presikhoven; married II Maximiliaan Wtter Leminge; married III Maximiliaan Tordesillas; married IV Maximiliaan Lignaro
 Filips (born Vianen 1541
Sarah (Santpoort 1544 –  1631); married I (Santpoort voor 1567) Albert van Egmond-Merenstein (1540 – 1595); married II Amelis Utenengh (died 1611)
 Reinoud (Vianen 1548 – Lexmond 1633), Lord of Bolswaard; married (Vuren  1585) Josina van Arkel van Asperen (1560 – 1601)

Gallery

References

1492 births
1556 deaths
Dutch nobility
Knights of the Golden Fleece
Reinoud 03
People from Velsen